Fair Play is a 1925 American silent drama film directed by Frank Hall Crane and starring Edith Thornton, Lou Tellegen and Gaston Glass.

Synopsis
The career of criminal lawyer Bruce Elliot is largely built up by his devoted secretary, Norma Keith. However unaware of her feelings for him, he marries a gold-digging woman. When she is then killed in an accident, Bruce is convicted of murder and it falls to Norma to scour the criminal underworld for evidence that will clear him.

Cast
 Edith Thornton as Norma Keith
 Lou Tellegen as Bruce Elliot
 Gaston Glass as Dickie Thane
 Betty Francisco as Rita Thane
 David Dunbar as Bull Mong
 Simon Greer as Charlie Morse

References

Bibliography
 Munden, Kenneth White. The American Film Institute Catalog of Motion Pictures Produced in the United States, Part 1. University of California Press, 1997.

External links
 

1925 films
1925 drama films
1920s English-language films
American silent feature films
Silent American drama films
American black-and-white films
Films directed by Frank Hall Crane
1920s American films